Arrows of Desire is the sixth solo album by Matthew Good, released in 2013. The album's lead single, "Had It Coming", was released on May 27, 2013. The album was nominated for "Rock Album of the Year" at the 2014 Juno Awards.

Commercial performance
The album debuted at #6 on the Canadian Albums Chart, selling 4,900 copies in its first week. It is Good's only album that has charted in the United States, reaching #46 on the Billboard Top Heatseekers chart.

Inspiration
In an interview with The Huffington Post, Good stated that inspiration for Arrows of Desire came from the rock bands that he listened to in his youth. Good specifically mentions The Pixies and Afghan Whigs as key influences when he was writing songs for the record.

Track listing
All songs written by Matthew Good.

Personnel
Matthew Good - guitar, vocals
Don Mills - bass
Jimmy Reid - lead guitar
Anthony Wright - piano, keyboards
Pat Steward - drums
Joel Livesey - recording engineer

References

2013 albums
Matthew Good albums